Operation Dawn 2 or Operation Valfajr-2 was an Iranian operation during the eight-year-long Iran–Iraq War. This operation opened a new front in northern Iraq/Iraqi Kurdistan also known as "the Northern Front". Despite Turkish help, this region was Iraq's weak point during the war as the Kurds sided with Iran.

Prelude
In the year leading up to the operation, fighting between Iraqi and Iranian forces drew to a stalemate on the southern front. Iranian forces repeatedly used human wave attacks in the southern marshlands and deserts, only to be repulsed by forces of the Iraqi Third Corps. However, the Iranian government managed to win favor of the Kurdish people in parts of northern Iraq, thus allowing the opportunity to take the war north.

The main objective of the mission was the frontier town of Haj Omran, which was nestled on the border and surrounded by mountainous terrain. Rebels of the Kurdistan Democratic Party of Iraq would prove a great asset to the advancing Iranians, given their knowledge of the terrain and the people.

The battle
On July 22, Iranian forces advanced from Piranshahr and were highly successful against the Iraqis, effectively seizing Haj Omran in the process. The Iranians and Kurdish guerrillas made use of elevated ridges to launch ambushes on Iraqi positions and convoys.

Iraq responded with counteroffensive, launching an airborne assault and employing the use of poison gas for the first time in the entire war. The Iraqis hit Iranian troops on mountain tops near Haj Omran with mustard gas while their troops advanced in the slopes. The Iraqis were unfamiliar with the properties of poison gas and the agent descended back down to the exposed Iraqi troops. At the same time, the rugged terrain held up Iraqi tanks. The use of helicopter gunships was also hampered, since the Iranian and Kurdish fighters had better cover.

These were the deciding factors that contributed to Iraq's loss of the battle.

Order of battle

Malik Ashtar Command
 Islamic Republic of Iran Army
 Islamic Republic of Iran Army Ground Forces
 77th "Pirooz" Infantry Division of Khorasan
 2nd Infantry Brigade of Quchan
 3 infantry battalions
 92nd Armored Division of Khuzestan
 1 mechanized battalion
 64th Infantry Division of Urmia
 1st Brigade
 1 infantry battalion
 Islamic Republic of Iran Army Aviation
 Islamic Revolutionary Guard Corps
14th Imam Hossein DivisionCommanded by Hujjat-ul-Islam Mostafa Raddanipoor
 2 infantry battalions
 33rd Al-Mahdi BrigadeCommanded by Mohammad Jaafar Asadi
 Fajr BattalionCommanded by Morteza Javidi
 9 other unnamed infantry battalions
 155th Shohada Special BrigadeCommanded by Mahmoud Kaveh
 2 infantry battalions
 8th Najaf Ashraf DivisionCommanded by Ahmad Kazemi
 2 infantry battalions
 Artillery unit
 11 artillery batteries
 Jihad of Construction
 Basij
 Gendarmerie
 Local tribal fighters

Source: 

 Kurdistan Democratic Party (KDP)
 Peshmerga
 1,000 militia fighters

 91st Infantry Brigade
 98th Infantry Brigade
 66th Infantry Brigade
 1 tank battalion
 31st Special Forces Brigade
 2nd Battalion
 Tariq Commando Battalion
 Ta'im Commando Battalion

References

 The Longest War, by Dilip Hiro, Routledge, Chapman, and Hall, Inc., NY, 1991.
 The Iran-Iraq War: Chaos in a Vacuum, by Stephen Pelletiere, Praeger Publishers, New York, NY, 1992.
 http://www.hamshahrionline.ir/details/1430

Dawn 2
Military operations involving chemical weapons during the Iran–Iraq War
Military operations of the Iran–Iraq War involving the Peshmerga